Chang Tai-shan (Amis name Ati Masaw; born 31 October 1976 in Taitung, Taiwan), is a Taiwanese former professional baseball player.

Career
He originally drafted by the Wei Chuan Dragons in 1996, he has played for the Sinon Bulls and Uni-President Lions of the Chinese Professional Baseball League. A well-known slugger, Chang has been a frequent member of the Chinese Taipei national baseball team since 1998 and holds the record of hitting the most home runs in CPBL history with 289. He also holds the career record for hits with 2,134.

He was missing from the Olympic Games as because he tested positive for a banned substance. Chang denies taking any banned drugs and thinks it may be because of medication he took. As a result of the test he may be banned for 3 years.

He was traded from Sinon Bulls to Uni-Lions for cash considerations of NT$2.5 Million (about US$85,000).

Chang signed on to play in the Australian Baseball League for the 2017-18 season with the Adelaide Bite.

Career statistics

References

External links

1976 births
Living people
Amis people
Asian Games bronze medalists for Chinese Taipei
Asian Games gold medalists for Chinese Taipei
Asian Games medalists in baseball
Asian Games silver medalists for Chinese Taipei
Baseball players at the 1998 Asian Games
Baseball players at the 2004 Summer Olympics
Baseball players at the 2006 Asian Games
Baseball players at the 2008 Summer Olympics
Baseball players at the 2010 Asian Games
Baseball players suspended for drug offenses
Medalists at the 1998 Asian Games
Medalists at the 2006 Asian Games
Medalists at the 2010 Asian Games
Olympic baseball players of Taiwan
People from Taitung County
Sinon Bulls players
Taiwanese expatriate baseball players in Japan
Taiwanese sportspeople in doping cases
Uni-President 7-Eleven Lions players
Wei Chuan Dragons players
2006 World Baseball Classic players
Taiwanese expatriate baseball players in Australia
Wei Chuan Dragons coaches